Bionico is a popular Mexican dessert that originated in the city of Guadalajara in Jalisco, Mexico, in the early 1990s. It is essentially a fruit salad consisting of a variety of fruits chopped up into small cubes, drenched with crema and topped off with granola, shredded coconut, raisins and sometimes honey. Any kind of fruit can be used, but it is most commonly made with papaya, cantaloupe, honeydew, strawberries, apples and banana.

The crema

The word crema is Spanish for cream, in this case the "crema" is usually a mix of condensed milk and sour cream, although there are many different recipes  (some include yogurt). There is another variation of the salad which uses cottage cheese instead of the crema. This variation is usually served with honey drizzled on top.

See also
 List of Mexican dishes
 List of salads

References

Fruit salads
Mexican desserts